The Harriers is a 1991 anthology of shared world short stories, edited by Gordon R. Dickson.  The stories are set in a world created by Dickson and are original to this collection.

Contents

 "Of War and Codes and Honor", by Gordon R. Dickson & Chelsea Quinn Yarbro
 "Into the Hot and Moist", by Steve Perry
 "Tonight We Improvise", by S. N. Lewitt

References

1991 books
Science fiction anthologies